Centenera is a municipality located in the province of Guadalajara, Castile-La Mancha, Spain.

Centenera may also refer to:
Centenera de Andaluz, a municipality located in the province of Soria, Castile and León, Spain. 
Martin del Barco Centenera, a Spanish cleric, explorer and author of the 16th century.
 A street in the city of Buenos Aires, Argentina, named after the Spanish cleric.
 Centenera Fábrica Sudamericana De Envases S.A., a defunct Argentinian company that manufactured tin packaging, part of the Bunge y Born holding.